Edgington Township is located in Rock Island County, Illinois. As of the 2010 census, its population was 1,508 and it contained 643 housing units.

Geography

Demographics

History
The first three settlers built their log cabins in the summer of 1834. The village of Edgington began at "four corners" in the township, while the village of Taylor Ridge straddled the eastern border of the township at Bowling Township.

References

External links
City-data.com
Illinois State Archives

Townships in Rock Island County, Illinois
Townships in Illinois